Suitcase or The Suitcase may also refer to:

People nicknamed "Suitcase" or "The Suitcase"
Gary Edwards (ice hockey) (born 1947), Canadian professional ice hockey goaltender
Bob Seeds (1907–1993), American professional baseball player
Harry Simpson (1925–1979), American professional baseball player
Gary Smith (ice hockey) (born 1944), Canadian professional ice hockey goaltender

Art, entertainment, and media

Films and television
"The Suitcase" (Mad Men), an episode of the TV series Mad Men
The Suitcase (1971 film) (La valija), a 1971 Argentine film

Literature
Suitcase, poetry collection by Roger Robinson (poet)
The Suitcase (novel), 1978 Russian novel by Sergei Dovlatov

Music
Suitcase101, a Filipino band

Albums
Suitcase (Keb' Mo' album) (2006)
Suitcase (Neil Arthur album) (1994)
Suitcase: Failed Experiments and Trashed Aircraft, a 2000 CD box set by Guided by Voices, followed by three further volumes

Songs
"Suitcase" (Anne Gadegaard song), 2015
"Suitcase" a 1971 song by Badfinger from Straight Up
"Suitcase" (Mary J. Blige song), 2014
"Suitcase", a 1980 song by Justin Hayward
"Suitcase", a 2011 song by Standard Fare

'"Suitcases", a 2011 song by Dara Maclean
"Suitcase", a 2017 song by Matthew Koma
"Suitcase", a 2010 song by Charlotte Church from Back to Scratch

Periodicals
SUITCASE (magazine), a fashion and travel publication